Sheila Hamanaka is an American freelance children's author and illustrator.

Life
Hamanaka is a Sansei Japanese American, the daughter of actor Conrad Yama and Mary Takaoka of the Vaudeville group Taka Sisters. She has two older siblings; the writer and musician V. Vale, and musician/singer Lionelle Hamanaka.

Hamanaka lives in Tappan, New York.

Awards
1992 American Book Award for The Journey

Works

 In Search Of The Spirit: The Living National Treasures of Japan, 1999 Morrow Junior, Sheila Hamanaka, Ayano Ohmi,

Illustrations

Criticism
"The "It Girl's" Guide To Chemo ", WBAI.org
"Slanted Screen: Emasculation of the Asian Male In Film", WBAI.org

References

American women illustrators
American illustrators
American children's writers
Living people
American women children's writers
American writers of Japanese descent
People from Tappan, New York
American Book Award winners
Year of birth missing (living people)
21st-century American women
American women writers of Asian descent